The Baca–Goodman House was a single-dwelling home in Tucumcari, New Mexico, United States. Tucumcari merchant Benito Baca built the house around 1905, and subsequent owner Herman Goodman expanded it in the 1920s.  It was added to the National Register of Historic Places in 1973 as an example of early 20th century New Mexico architecture, but it was removed from the Register four years later.

See also

National Register of Historic Places listings in Quay County, New Mexico

References

External links

 Google StreetView Northwest corner of 3rd and Aber, Tucumcari, New Mexico

Houses in Quay County, New Mexico
Houses on the National Register of Historic Places in New Mexico
Historic American Buildings Survey in New Mexico
Former National Register of Historic Places in New Mexico
Houses completed in 1905
Tucumcari, New Mexico
National Register of Historic Places in Quay County, New Mexico
1905 establishments in New Mexico Territory